Micah Rucker (born January 4, 1985) is a former American football wide receiver. He was signed by the Pittsburgh Steelers as an undrafted free agent in 2008. He played college football at Eastern Illinois.

College 

Rucker started his college career at Minnesota before transferring to Eastern Illinois. At EIU, Rucker caught 49 passes for 966 yards and 11 touchdowns in 2006. In 2007, he caught 55 passes for 777 yards and seven scores.

NFL 

Rucker has also been a member of the Kansas City Chiefs and the New York Giants. The Giants cut him on July 30, 2009, to make room for incoming draft picks.

Arena Football League 

Rucker signed with the Orlando Predators of the Arena Football League during the 2010 offseason. Before the season, Rucker was traded to the Chicago Rush for wide receiver Robert Quiroga and became one of Chicago's three starting wide receivers, catching 18 passes, 161 yards and four touchdowns through four games.

External links 

 Minnesota Golden Gophers bio
 New York Giants bio
 Pittsburgh Steelers bio

1985 births
Living people
People from Bonita Springs, Florida
Players of American football from Florida
American football wide receivers
Minnesota Golden Gophers football players
Eastern Illinois Panthers football players
Pittsburgh Steelers players
Kansas City Chiefs players
New York Giants players
Orlando Predators players
Chicago Rush players
New Orleans VooDoo players